This is a list of notable people who were born, lived or are/were famously associated with Jerusalem. The list is in chronological order.

List

Ancient 
Melchizedek, Jebusite King of Salem and priest who blesses Abram
Abdi-Heba, Hurrian chieftain
Zadok, Levitical High Priest
King David (c. 1040 BCE – c. 970 BCE), second King of the united Kingdom of Israel
Araunah, Jebusite vendor of land
Solomon the Great (c. 1011 BCE – c. 931 BCE), third King of Israel
Hezekiah, thirteenth king of Judah
Isaiah, a major prophet of ancient Israel living around the time of 8th-century BC Kingdom of Judah
Joel, a prophet of ancient Israel, the second of the twelve minor prophets

Antiquity
Judas Maccabeus (d. 160 BCE), leader of the Maccabean revolt against the Seleucid Empire
Herod the Great, (d. 4 BCE), a Roman client king of Judea who expanded the Second Temple in Jerusalem and built the fortress at Masada
Hillel the Elder (110 BCE – 10 CE), a famous Jewish religious leader and one of the most important figures in Jewish history, associated with the development of the Mishnah and the Talmud
Josephus (37–100), Jewish-Roman historian
James the Just (d. 69), Jewish-Christian Bishop of Jerusalem
Simon bar Kokhba (d. 135), leader of the Bar Kokhba revolt against the Roman Empire in 132 CE

Medieval 
al-Muqaddasi (946–1000), Arab geographer
Aaron of Jerusalem, was a Karaite scholar of the eleventh century
Ibn al-Qaisarani (1056–1113), Arab historian
Judah Halevi (1075–1141), Spanish Jewish physician, poet and philosopher
Baldwin IV of Jerusalem (1161–1185), King of the Crusader State in Jerusalem
Nahmanides (1194–1270), prominent medieval Jewish rabbi and physician

Modern 
born 1820–1849
William Holman Hunt (1827–1910), English painter, cofounder of the Pre-Raphaelite Brotherhood
Conrad Schick (1822–1901), German architect, archaeologist and Protestant missionary
Yousef Al-Khalidi (1829–1907), Mayor of Jerusalem and Member of the Ottoman Parliament
Haim Aharon Valero (1845–1923), banker, entrepreneur and a prominent figure in the Jewish community of 19th century Jerusalem
Eliezer Ben-Yehuda (1858–1922), Litvak lexicographer and newspaper editor credited for the revival of the Hebrew language in the modern era

born 1850–1879
Shlomo Moussaieff (1852–1922), a founder of the Bukharim neighborhood
Herbert Plumer (1857–1932), senior British Army officer of the First World War
Menachem Ussishkin (1863–1941), Zionist leader and head of the Jewish National Fund
Abraham Isaac Kook (1865–1935), first Ashkenazi chief rabbi of Mandatory Palestine
Khalil al-Sakakini (1878–1953), Palestinian Christian scholar and Arab nationalist

born 1880–1909
Shmuel Yosef Agnon (1888–1970), Israeli Nobel Prize laureate writer and was one of the central figures of modern Hebrew fiction
Helena Kagan (1889–1978), physician, Israeli pioneer in pediatrics
Rachel Bluwstein (1890–1931), Hebrew poet
Ludwig Blum (1891–1975), Czechoslovakia-born Israeli painter, known as "the painter of Jerusalem"
Daniel Auster (1893–1963), three time Mayor of Jerusalem
Haj Amin al-Husayni (1897–1974), Palestinian Arab nationalist and influential Muslim leader in Mandatory Palestine
Yaakov Ades (1898–1963), Sephardi Hakham, Rosh Yeshiva, and Rabbinical High Court judge

born 1910s
Teddy Kollek (1911–2007), mayor of Jerusalem and founder of the Jerusalem Foundation
Ruhi al-Khatib (1914–1994), Palestinian nationalist and politician
Ruchoma Shain (1914–2013), teacher and author 
Ephraim Katzir (1916–2009), biophysicist and fourth President of Israel
Yigael Yadin (1917–1984), Israeli archeologist, politician, and second Chief of Staff of the IDF
Menachem Lewin (1918–2011) Israeli chemist working in polymer, fiber and nanotechnology research

born 1920s
Yitzhak Navon (1921–2015), politician (fifth President of Israel), diplomat, and author
Yitzhak Rabin (1922–1995), general, the fifth Prime Minister of Israel, and Nobel Peace Prize winner
Trude Dothan (1922–2016), Austrian Jewish archaeologist in Israel
Yitzchok Scheiner (1922–2021), rabbi
Shlomo Hillel (1923–2021), Israeli diplomat, Speaker of the Knesset, Minister of Police and Minister of Internal Affairs
Zundel Kroizer (1924–2014), rabbi 
Walid Khalidi (born 1925), Palestinian historian
Uzi Narkiss (1925–1997), Israeli general and commander of the Israel Defense Forces units in the Central Region during the Six-Day War
Rehavam Ze'evi (1926–2001), assassinated Israeli general, historian, founder of the Moledet party, and Minister of Tourism
Yaakov Blau (1929–2013), rabbi

born 1930s
Reuven Adiv (1930–2004), Israeli and international actor, director and drama teacher
Robert Aumann (born 1930), Israeli-American mathematician and game-theorist, received the Nobel Prize in Economics in 2005 for his work on conflict and cooperation through game-theory analysis
Naseer Aruri (1934–2015), Palestinian scholar and activist
Edward Said (1935–2003), Palestinian author and political theorist
A.B. Yehoshua (born 1936), Israeli novelist, essayist, and playwright
Shlomo Aronson (1936–2018), Israeli landscape architect
Yehoram Gaon (born 1939), Israeli singer, actor, director, producer, TV and radio host, and public figure
Amos Oz (1939–2018) Israeli writer, novelist, and journalist
Reuven Rivlin (born 1939), former Minister of Communications and Speaker of the Knesset, former President of Israel
Ada Yonath (born 1939), Israeli crystallographer best known for her pioneering work on the structure of the ribosome, winner of the Nobel Prize in Chemistry in 2009

born 1940s
Matan Vilnai (born 1944), Minister of Science, Culture & Sport, Minister of Science and Technology, Minister for Home Front Defense, Ambassador to China, IDF Major General
Makram Khoury (born 1945), Israeli Arab actor and winner of the Israel Prize
Ehud Olmert (born 1945), former Mayor of Jerusalem and Prime-Minister of Israel
Mahmoud al-Zahar (born 1945), co-founder of Hamas
Yoni Netanyahu (1946–1976), commander of Sayeret Matkal; killed in action during Operation Entebbe
Esther Farbstein (born 1946), Holocaust scholar
Nahman Shai (born 1946), Israeli journalist, Deputy Speaker of the Knesset, IDF spokesman
Dan Meridor (born 1947) Israeli Minister of Justice, Minister of Finance, and Deputy Prime Minister

born 1950s
Munib Younan (born 1950), president of the Lutheran World Federation
Mustafa Barghouti (born 1954), Palestinian physician, activist, and PLO politician
Anat Hoffman (born 1954), Israeli activist and director of Women of the Wall
Francis Martin O'Donnell (born 1954), former United Nations diplomat, Ambassador of Sovereign Military Order of Malta, author
Saeb Erekat (1955–2020), Palestinian negotiator of the Oslo Accords with Israel
Sallai Meridor (born 1955), Israeli Ambassador to the United States, Chairman of the Jewish Agency for Israel and the World Zionist Organization
Jamal Dajani (born 1957), Palestinian-American journalist and producer, co-founder of Arab Talk Radio
Uri Malmilian (born 1957), Israeli soccer player with most appearances for Beitar Jerusalem F.C. 
Eli Ohana (born 1957), all-time top-scorer for Israel's Beitar Jerusalem F.C.

born since 1960
Guy Starik (born 1965), Olympian shooter with world record in 50 m rifle prone
Elisha Abas (born 1971), Israeli pianist, composer, and former professional soccer player
Jonah Lotan (born 1973), actor
Natalie Portman (born 1981), Israeli-American actress, lived in Jerusalem until she was three years old
Shahar Pe'er (born 1987), Israeli tennis player, highest world singles ranking # 11, highest world doubles ranking # 14
Or Sasson (born 1990), Israeli Olympic medalist judoka

unknown date of birth
Meche Marchand, Puerto Rican actress and writer

Honorary citizens
People awarded the honorary citizenship of Jerusalem are:

See also 

Demographic history of Jerusalem
List of Israelis
List of Palestinians
Mayor of Jerusalem
Timeline of Jerusalem

References

External links 

 
People
People
Jerusalem
Jerusalem
Jerusalem